Siegershausen is a village and former municipality in the canton of Thurgau, Switzerland.

In 1984 the municipality Dippishausen-Oftershausen was incorporated into Siegershausen.

In 1996 Siegershausen municipality was merged with the other, neighboring municipalities Alterswilen, Altishausen, Dotnacht, Ellighausen, Hugelshofen, Lippoldswilen and Neuwilen to form a new and larger municipality Kemmental.

Former municipalities of Thurgau
Villages in Switzerland